Mete Akyol (1935, Ordu - 2 November 2016, Istanbul) was a Turkish journalist.

He studied in Talas American Junior High school and Tarsus American High school. He graduated from the English Literature section of Ankara University in 1960.

Beginning by 1959, he served in the Milliyet, Öncü, Hürriyet, Dünya, Günaydın and Sabah newspapers as a reporter, columnist and  editor. He also served in the television channels Turkish Radio and Television Corporation (TRT), NTV, TV8 and  Kanal B. Between 1998 and his death date, he was the executive editor of the periodical Bütün Dünya,  a periodical similar to Reader's Digest.

Beginning by 1987, he also lectured in the Istanbul University, Marmara University and Başkent University.

Mete Akyol died on 2 November 2016 in Istanbul.

Books
Düzenzedeler ("System victıms") 
Mevzuat böyle Efendim ("Sir this is the regulation") 
Yazamadıklarım ("Those which I couldn't write")
Hem yaşadım Hem yazdım ("I lived and wrote") 
Aynen naklen ("As it is and as by rumor")
Bir başkadır benim mesleğim ("My profession is a different profession")

References

1935 births
2016 deaths
20th-century Turkish journalists
Academic staff of Istanbul University
Ankara University alumni
People from Ordu
Turkish columnists
Tarsus American College alumni
Milliyet people
Hürriyet people
Günaydın (newspaper) people
Sabah (newspaper) people
Academic staff of Marmara University
Academic staff of Başkent University